Aleksandra Vyachelsavovna Frantseva (born 24 April 1987) is a Russian Paralympic alpine skier who won two gold, two silver and a bronze medals at the 2014 Winter Paralympics in Sochi, Russia. She performed in the events for the athletes with impaired vision where she was assisted by a guide named Pavel Zabotin.

Personal history
Aleksandra Frantseva was born in Kamchatka Krai. On 17 March 2014 she was awarded Russian Order "For Merit to the Fatherland", IV class.

Career
On 18 January 2014 she won 2014 Alpine Skiing World Cup by beating Jade Etherington by one hundredth of a second in Copper Mountain, Colorado.

At the 2014 Paralympics, Frantseva won gold medals in slalom and super combined and also won silver one for super-G defeating Etherington on Friday 14 March. Later on she won a bronze medal for downhill skiing at the same place.

References

1987 births
Living people
People from Petropavlovsk-Kamchatsky
Russian female alpine skiers
Paralympic bronze medalists for Russia
Paralympic gold medalists for Russia
Paralympic silver medalists for Russia
Alpine skiers at the 2014 Winter Paralympics
Medalists at the 2014 Winter Paralympics
Medalists at the 2014 Winter Olympics
Olympic gold medalists for Russia
Paralympic medalists in alpine skiing
Paralympic alpine skiers of Russia
20th-century Russian women
21st-century Russian women